Dame Helen Mirren  (born Helen Lydia Mironoff; born 26 July 1945) is an English actor. The recipient of numerous accolades, she is the only performer to have achieved the Triple Crown of Acting in both the United States and the United Kingdom. She received an Academy Award and a British Academy Film Award for her portrayal of Queen Elizabeth II in The Queen, a Tony Award and a Laurence Olivier Award for the same role in The Audience, three British Academy Television Awards for her performance as DCI Jane Tennison in Prime Suspect, four Primetime Emmy Awards and a Children's and Family Emmy Award.

Mirren's stage performance as Cleopatra in Antony and Cleopatra at the National Youth Theatre in 1965 provided her an opportunity to join the Royal Shakespeare Company, before making her West End stage debut in 1975. She subsequently went on to achieve success in film and television, appearing in films such as The Madness of King George (1994), Gosford Park (2001), and The Last Station (2009), receiving Academy Award nominations for each of those performances. For her role on Prime Suspect, which ran from 1991 to 2006, she won three consecutive British Academy Television Awards for Best Actress (1992, 1993 and 1994)—a record of consecutive wins shared with Dame Julie Walters—and two Primetime Emmy Awards. She played Queen Elizabeth I in the television series Elizabeth I (2005), and Queen Elizabeth II in the film The Queen (2006); she is the only actor to have portrayed both of the regnant Elizabeths on screen.

After her breakthrough role in The Long Good Friday (1980), Mirren appeared in a variety of other films including Cal (1984), for which she won the Cannes Film Festival Award for Best Actress, 2010 (1984), The Cook, the Thief, His Wife & Her Lover (1989), Teaching Mrs. Tingle (1999), Calendar Girls (2003), The Tempest (2010), The Debt (2010), Hitchcock (2012), The Hundred-Foot Journey (2014), Woman in Gold (2015), Eye in the Sky (2015), Trumbo (2015), and The Leisure Seeker (2017). She has also appeared in several action films such as Red (2010) and its sequel Red 2 (2013), as well as in the Fast & Furious film franchise The Fate of the Furious (2017), Hobbs & Shaw (2019), and F9 (2021).

In the Queen's 2003 Birthday Honours, Mirren was appointed a Dame (DBE) for services to drama, with investiture taking place at Buckingham Palace. 
She's received numerous honours including a star on the Hollywood Walk of Fame in 2013, the BAFTA Fellowship for lifetime achievement in 2014, and Screen Actors Guild Life Achievement Award in 2022.

Early life

Mirren was born Helen Lydia Mironoff on 26 July 1945 at Queen Charlotte's and Chelsea Hospital in the Hammersmith district of London, to an English mother and Russian father. Her mother, Kathleen "Kitty" Alexandrina Eva Matilda (née Rogers; 1908–1996), was a working-class woman from West Ham, the thirteenth of fourteen children born to a butcher whose own father was the butcher to Queen Victoria. Mirren's father, Vasily Petrovich Mironoff (1913–1980), was a member of an exiled family of the Russian nobility; he was taken to England when he was two by his father, Pyotr Vasilievich Mironov. Pyotr Mironov, who owned a family estate near Gzhatsk (now Gagarin), was part of the Russian aristocracy. His mother, Mirren's great-grandmother, was Countess Lydia Andreevna Kamenskaya, an aristocrat and a descendant of Count Mikhail Fedotovich Kamensky, a prominent Russian general in the Napoleonic Wars. Pyotr Mironov served as a colonel in the Imperial Russian Army and fought in the 1904 Russo-Japanese War. He became a diplomat and was negotiating an arms deal in Britain when he and his family were stranded by the Russian Revolution in 1917. He settled in England and became a London cab driver to support his family.

Vasily Mironoff also played the viola with the London Philharmonic Orchestra before World War II. He was an ambulance driver during the war, and served in the East End of London during the Blitz. He and Kathleen Rogers married in Hammersmith in 1938, and at some point before 1951 he anglicised his first name to Basil. Shortly after Helen's birth, her father left the orchestra and returned to driving a cab to support the family. He later worked as a driving-test examiner, then became a civil servant with the Ministry of Transport. In 1951, he changed the family name to Mirren by deed poll. Mirren considers her upbringing to have been "very anti-monarchist". She was the second of three children; she has an older sister Katherine ("Kate"; born 1942) and had a younger brother Peter Basil (1947–2002). Her paternal cousin was Tania Mallet, a model and Bond girl. Mirren was brought up in Leigh-on-Sea, Essex.

Mirren attended Hamlet Court primary school in Westcliff-on-Sea, where she had the lead role in a school production of Hansel and Gretel, and St Bernard's High School for Girls in Southend-on-Sea, where she also acted in school productions. She subsequently attended a teaching college, the New College of Speech and Drama in London, "housed within Anna Pavlova's old home, Ivy House" on North End Road. At the age of eighteen, she passed the audition for the National Youth Theatre (NYT); and at twenty, she played Cleopatra in the NYT production of Antony and Cleopatra at the Old Vic, a role which she says "launched my career" and led to her signing with agent Al Parker.

Theatre career

Early years
As a result of her work for the National Youth Theatre, Mirren was invited to join the Royal Shakespeare Company (RSC). While with the RSC, she played Castiza in Trevor Nunn's 1966 staging of The Revenger's Tragedy, Diana in All's Well That Ends Well (1967), Cressida in Troilus and Cressida (1968), Rosalind in As You Like It (1968), Julia in The Two Gentlemen of Verona (1970), Tatiana in Gorky's Enemies at the Aldwych (1971), and the title role in Miss Julie at The Other Place (1971). She also appeared in four productions, directed by Braham Murray for Century Theatre at the University Theatre in Manchester, between 1965 and 1967.

In 1970, the director and producer John Goldschmidt made a documentary film, Doing Her Own Thing, about Mirren during her time with the Royal Shakespeare Company. Made for ATV, it was shown on the ITV network in the UK. In 1972 and 1973, Mirren worked with Peter Brook's International Centre for Theatre Research and joined the group's tour in North Africa and the US, during which they created The Conference of the Birds. She then rejoined the RSC, playing Lady Macbeth at Stratford in 1974 and at the Aldwych Theatre in 1975.

Sally Beauman reported, in her 1982 history of the RSC, that Mirren—while appearing in Nunn's Macbeth (1974), and in a letter to The Guardian newspaper—had sharply criticised both the National Theatre and the RSC for their lavish production expenditure, declaring it "unnecessary and destructive to the art of the Theatre", and adding, "The realms of truth, emotion and imagination reached for in acting a great play have become more and more remote, often totally unreachable across an abyss of costume and technicalities..." This started a big debate, and led to a question in parliament. There were no discernible repercussions for this rebuke of the RSC.

West End and RSC
At the West End's Royal Court Theatre in September 1975, she played the role of a rock star named Maggie in Teeth 'n' Smiles, a musical play by David Hare; she reprised the role the following year in a revival of the play at Wyndham's Theatre in May 1976.

Beginning in November 1975, Mirren played in West End repertory with the Lyric Theatre Company as Nina in The Seagull and Ella in Ben Travers's new farce The Bed Before Yesterday ("Mirren is stirringly voluptuous as the Harlowesque good-time girl": Michael Billington, The Guardian). At the RSC in Stratford in 1977, and at the Aldwych the following year, she played a steely Queen Margaret in Terry Hands' production of the three parts of Henry VI, while 1979 saw her 'bursting with grace', and winning acclaim for her performance as Isabella in Peter Gill's production of Measure for Measure at Riverside Studios.

In 1981, she returned to the Royal Court for the London premiere of Brian Friel's Faith Healer. That same year she also won acclaim for her performance in the title role of John Webster's The Duchess of Malfi, a production of Manchester's Royal Exchange Theatre which was later transferred to The Roundhouse in Chalk Farm, London. Reviewing her portrayal for The Sunday Telegraph, Francis King wrote: "Miss Mirren never leaves it in doubt that even in her absences, this ardent, beautiful woman is the most important character of the story." In her performance as Moll Cutpurse in The Roaring Girl—at the Royal Shakespeare Theatre in January 1983, and at the Barbican Theatre in April 1983—she was described as having "swaggered through the action with radiant singularity of purpose, filling in areas of light and shade that even Thomas Middleton and Thomas Dekker omitted." – Michael Coveney, Financial Times, April 1983.

At the beginning of 1989, Mirren co-starred with Bob Peck at the Young Vic in the London premiere of the Arthur Miller double-bill, Two Way Mirror, performances which prompted Miller to remark: "What is so good about English actors is that they are not afraid of the open expression of large emotions. British actors like to speak. In London, there’s a much more open-hearted kind of exchange between stage and audience" (interview by Sheridan Morley: The Times 11 January 1989). In Elegy for a Lady she played the svelte proprietress of a classy boutique, while as the blonde hooker in Some Kind of Love Story she was "clad in a Freudian slip and shifting easily from waif-like vulnerability to sexual aggression, giving the role a breathy Monroesque quality".

On 15 February 2013, at the West End's Gielgud Theatre she began a turn as Elizabeth II in the World Premiere of Peter Morgan's The Audience. The show was directed by Stephen Daldry. In April she was named best actress at the Olivier Awards for her role.

Broadway debut
A further stage breakthrough came in 1994, in an Yvonne Arnaud Theatre production bound for the West End, when Bill Bryden cast her as Natalya Petrovna in Ivan Turgenev's A Month in the Country. Her co-stars were John Hurt as her aimless lover Rakitin and Joseph Fiennes in only his second professional stage appearance as the cocksure young tutor Belyaev.

Prior to 2015, Mirren had twice been nominated for Broadway's Tony Award for Best Actress in a Play: in 1995 for her Broadway debut in A Month in the Country and then again in 2002 for The Dance of Death, co-starring with Sir Ian McKellen, their fraught rehearsal period coinciding with the terrorist attacks on New York on 11 September 2001.

On 7 June 2015‚ Mirren won the Tony Award for Best Actress in a Play‚ for her portrayal of Queen Elizabeth II in The Audience (a performance which also won her the Laurence Olivier Award for Best Actress). Her Tony Award win made her one of the few actors to achieve the US “Triple Crown of Acting”, joining the ranks of acclaimed performers including Ingrid Bergman‚ Dame Maggie Smith, and Al Pacino.

National Theatre
In 1998, Mirren played Cleopatra to Alan Rickman's Antony in Antony and Cleopatra at the National Theatre. The production received poor reviews; The Guardian called it "plodding spectacle rarely informed by powerful passion", while The Daily Telegraph said "the crucial sexual chemistry on which any great production ultimately depends is fatally absent". In 2000 Nicholas Hytner, who had worked with Mirren on the film version of The Madness of King George, cast her as Lady Torrance in his revival of Tennessee Williams' Orpheus Descending at the Donmar Warehouse in London. Michael Billington, reviewing for The Guardian, described her performance as "an exemplary study of an immigrant woman who has acquired a patina of resilient toughness but who slowly acknowledges her sensuality."

At the National Theatre in November 2003 she again won praise playing Christine Mannon ("defiantly cool, camp and skittish", Evening Standard; "glows with mature sexual allure", Daily Telegraph) in a revival of Eugene O'Neill's Mourning Becomes Electra directed by Howard Davies. "This production was one of the best experiences of my professional life, The play was four and a half hours long, and I have never known that kind of response from an audience ... It was the serendipity of a beautifully cast play, with great design and direction, It will be hard to be in anything better." She played the title role in Jean Racine's Phèdre at the National in 2009, in a production directed by Nicholas Hytner. The production was also staged at the Epidaurus amphitheatre on 11 and 12 July 2009.

Film career
Mirren has appeared in a large number of films throughout her career. Some of her earlier film appearances include roles in Herostratus (1967) Dir. Don Levy, Midsummer Night's Dream (1968), Age of Consent (1969), O Lucky Man! (1973), Caligula (1979), The Long Good Friday (1980)—co-starring with Bob Hoskins in what was her breakthrough film role, Excalibur (1981), 2010 (1984), White Nights (1985), The Mosquito Coast (1986), Pascali's Island (1988) and When the Whales Came (1989). She appeared in The Madness of King George (1994), Some Mother's Son (1996), Painted Lady (1997) and The Prince of Egypt (1998). In Peter Greenaway's colorful The Cook, The Thief, His Wife and Her Lover, Mirren plays the wife opposite Michael Gambon. In Teaching Mrs. Tingle (1999), she plays sadistic history teacher Mrs Eve Tingle.

In 2007, she claimed that the director Michael Winner had treated her "like a piece of meat" at a casting call in 1964. Asked about the incident, Winner told The Guardian: "I don't remember asking her to turn around but if I did I wasn't being serious. I was only doing what the [casting] agent asked me – and for this I get reviled! Helen's a lovely person, she's a great actress and I'm a huge fan, but her memory of that moment is a little flawed."

Mirren continued her successful film career when she starred in Gosford Park (2001) with Maggie Smith and Calendar Girls (2003) with Julie Walters. Other more recent appearances include The Clearing (2004), Pride (2004), Raising Helen (2004), and Shadowboxer (2005). Mirren also provided the voice for the supercomputer "Deep Thought" in the film adaptation of Douglas Adams's The Hitchhiker's Guide to the Galaxy (2005). During her career, she has portrayed three British queens in different films and television series: Elizabeth I in the television series Elizabeth I (2005), Elizabeth II in The Queen (2006), and Charlotte in The Madness of King George (1994). She is the only actor to have portrayed both Queens Elizabeth on the screen.

Mirren's title role of The Queen earned her numerous acting awards including a BAFTA, a Golden Globe, and an Academy Award, among many others. During her acceptance speech at the Academy Award ceremony, she praised and thanked Elizabeth II and stated that she had maintained her dignity and weathered many storms during her reign. Mirren later appeared in supporting roles in the films National Treasure: Book of Secrets, Inkheart, State of Play, and The Last Station, for which she was nominated for an Oscar.

2000–2009

Mirren's first film of the 2000s was Joel Hershman's Greenfingers (2000), a comedy based on the true story about the prisoners of HMP Leyhill, a minimum-security prison, who won gardening awards. Mirren portrayed a devoted plantswoman in the film, who coaches a team of prison gardeners, led by Clive Owen, to victory at a prestigious flower show. The project received lukewarm reviews, which suggested that it added "nothing new to this already saturated genre" of British feel-good films.

The same year, she began work on the mystery film The Pledge, Sean Penn's third directorial effort, in which she played a child psychologist. A critical success, the ensemble film tanked at the box office. Also that year, she filmed the American-Icelandic satirical drama No Such Thing opposite Sarah Polley. Directed by Hal Hartley, Mirren portrayed a soulless television producer in the film, who strives for sensationalistic stories. It was largely panned by critics.

Her biggest critical and commercial success, released in 2001, became Robert Altman's all-star ensemble mystery film Gosford Park. A homage to writer Agatha Christie's whodunit style, the story follows a party of wealthy Britons and an American, and their servants, who gather for a shooting weekend at an English country house, resulting in an unexpected murder. It received multiple awards and nominations, including a second Academy Award nomination and first Screen Actors Guild Award win for Mirren's portrayal of the sternly devoted head servant Mrs. Wilson. Mirren's last film that year was Fred Schepisi's dramedy film Last Orders opposite Michael Caine and Bob Hoskins.

In 2003, Mirren starred in Nigel Cole's comedy Calendar Girls, inspired by the true story of a group of Yorkshire women who produced a nude calendar to raise money for Leukaemia Research under the auspices of the Women's Institutes. Mirren initially was reluctant to join the project, dismissing it as another middling British picture, but rethought her decision upon learning of the casting of co-star Julie Walters. The film was generally well received by critics, and grossed $96 million worldwide. In addition, the picture earned Satellite, Golden Globe, and European Film Award nominations for Mirren. Her other film that year was the Showtime television film The Roman Spring of Mrs. Stone opposite Olivier Martinez, and Anne Bancroft, based on the 1950 novel of the same title by Tennessee Williams.

2010–2014
In 2010, Mirren appeared in five films. In Love Ranch, directed by her husband Taylor Hackford, she portrayed Sally Conforte, one half of a married couple who opened the first legal brothel in the US, the Mustang Ranch in Storey County, Nevada. Mirren starred in the principal role of Prospera, the duchess of Milan, in Julie Taymor's The Tempest. This was based on the play of the same name by Shakespeare; Taymor changed the original character's gender to cast Mirren as her lead. While the actor garnered strong reviews for her portrayal, the film itself was largely panned by critics.

Mirren played a gutsy tea-shop owner who tries to save one of her young employees from marrying a teenage killer in Rowan Joffé's Brighton Rock, a crime film loosely based on Graham Greene's 1938 novel. The film noir premiered at the Toronto International Film Festival in September 2010, where it received mixed reviews. Mirren's biggest critical and commercial success of the year was Robert Schwentke's ensemble action comedy Red, based on Warren Ellis’s graphic novel, in which she portrayed Victoria, an ex-MI6 assassin. Mirren was initially hesitant to sign on due to film's graphic violence, but changed her mind upon learning of Bruce Willis' involvement. Released to positive reviews, it grossed $186.5 million worldwide. Also in 2010, the actor lent her voice to Zack Snyder's computer-animated fantasy film Legend of the Guardians: The Owls of Ga'Hoole, voicing antagonist Nyra, a leader of a group of owls. The film grossed $140.1 million on an $80 million budget.

Mirren's next film was the comedy film Arthur, a remake of the 1981 film of the same name, starring Russell Brand in the lead role. Arthur received generally negative reviews from critics, who declared it an "irritating, unnecessary remake." In preparation for her role as a retired Israeli Mossad agent in the film The Debt, Mirren reportedly immersed herself in studies of Hebrew language, Jewish history, and Holocaust writing, including the life of Simon Wiesenthal, while in Israel in 2009 for the filming of some of the movie's scenes. The film is a remake of a 2007 Israeli film of the same name.

In 2012, Mirren played Alfred Hitchcock's wife Alma Reville in the 2012 biopic Hitchcock, directed by Sacha Gervasi and based on Stephen Rebello's non-fiction book Alfred Hitchcock and the Making of Psycho. The film centres on the pair's relationship during the making of Psycho, a controversial horror film that became one of the most acclaimed and influential works in the filmmaker's career. It became a moderate arthouse success and garnered a lukewarm critical response from critics, who felt that it suffered from "tonal inconsistency and a lack of truly insightful retrospection." Mirren was universally praised, however, with Roger Ebert noting that the film depended most on her portrayal, which he found to be "warm and effective." Her other film that year was The Door, a claustrophobic drama film directed by István Szabó, based on the Hungarian novel of the same name. Set at the height of communist rule in 1960s Hungary, the story of the adaptation centres on the abrasive influence that a mysterious housekeeper wields over her employer and successful novelist, played Martina Gedeck. Mirren found the role "difficult to play" and cited doing it as "one of the hardest things [she has] ever done."

The following year, Mirren replaced Bette Midler in David Mamet's biographical television film Phil Spector about the American musician. The HBO film focuses on the relationship between Spector and his defense attorney Linda Kenney Baden, played by Mirren, during the first of his two murder trials for the death in 2003 of Lana Clarkson in his California mansion. Spector received largely mixed to positive reviews from critics, particularly for Mirren and co-star Al Pacino's performances, and was nominated for eleven Primetime Emmy Awards, also winning Mirren a Screen Actors Guild Award at the 20th awards ceremony. The film drew criticism both from Clarkson's family and friends, who charged that the suicide defense was given more merit than it deserved, and from Spector's wife, who argued that Spector was portrayed as a "foul-mouthed megalomaniac" and a "minotaur". Also in 2013, Mirren voiced the character of Dean Abigail Hardscrabble in Pixar's computer-animated comedy film Monsters University, which grossed $743 million against its estimated budget of $200 million, and reprised her role in the sequel film Red 2. The action comedy received a mixed reviews from film critics, who called it a "lackadaisical sequel", but became another commercial success, making over $140 million worldwide.

Mirren's only film of 2014 was the comedy-drama The Hundred-Foot Journey opposite the Indian actor Om Puri. Directed by Lasse Hallström and produced by Steven Spielberg and Oprah Winfrey, the film is based on Richard C. Morais' 2010 novel with the same name and tells the story of a feud between two adjacent restaurants in a French town. Mirren garnered largely positive reviews for her performance of a snobby restaurateur, a role which she accepted as she was keen to play a French character, reflecting her "pathetic attempt at being a French actress." The film earned her another Golden Globe nomination and became a modest commercial success, grossing $88.9 million worldwide.

2015–present

In 2015, Mirren reunited with her former assistant Simon Curtis on Woman in Gold, co-starring Ryan Reynolds. The film was based on the true story of Jewish refugee Maria Altmann, who, together with her young lawyer Randy Schoenberg, fought the Austrian government to be reunited with Gustav Klimt's painting of her aunt, the famous Portrait of Adele Bloch-Bauer I. The film received mixed reviews from critics, although Mirren and Reynold's performances were widely praised. A commercial success, Woman in Gold became one of the highest-grossing specialty films of the year. The same year, Mirren appeared in Gavin Hood's thriller Eye in the Sky (2015), in which she played as a military intelligence officer who leads a secret drone mission to capture a terrorist group living in Nairobi, Kenya. Mirren's last film that year was Jay Roach's biographical drama Trumbo, co-starring Bryan Cranston and Diane Lane. The actor played Hedda Hopper, the famous actor and gossip columnist, in the film, which received generally positive reviews from critics and garnered her a 14th Golden Globe nomination.

Mirren's only film of 2016 was Collateral Beauty, directed by David Frankel. Co-Starring Will Smith, Keira Knightley, and Kate Winslet, the ensemble drama follows a man who copes with his daughter's death by writing letters to time, death, and love. The film earned largely negative reviews from critics, who called it "well-meaning but fundamentally flawed." In 2017, Mirren narrated Cries from Syria, a documentary film about the Syrian Civil War, directed by Evgeny Afineevsky. Also that year, she made an uncredited cameo appearance in F. Gary Gray's The Fate of the Furious, the eighth instalment in the Fast & Furious franchise, playing Magdalene, the mother of Owen and Deckard Shaw. Mirren had a larger role in director Paolo Virzì's English-language debut The Leisure Seeker, based on the 2009 novel of the same name. On set, she was reunited with Donald Sutherland with whom she had not worked again since Bethune: The Making of a Hero (1990), portraying a terminally ill couple who escape from their retirement home and take one last cross-country adventure in a vintage van. At the 75th awards ceremony, Mirren received her 15th Golden Globe nomination.

In 2018, Mirren portrayed heiress Sarah Winchester in the supernatural horror film Winchester, directed by The Spierig Brothers. In the same year, she starred as Mother Ginger in Disney's adaptation of The Nutcracker, titled The Nutcracker and the Four Realms, directed by Lasse Hallström and Joe Johnston. In 2019, she appeared in the ensemble film Berlin, I Love You, the French crime thriller film Anna, directed and written by Luc Besson, and co-starred in the Fast and the Furious spin-off Hobbs & Shaw. In March 2021, she was cast as the villain Hespera in the upcoming superhero film Shazam! Fury of the Gods.

Mirren is set to portray Golda Meir, prime minister of Israel 1969–1974, in a biopic entitled Golda. As of April 2021, the film was in production. She also appeared in the 2022 music video for Kendrick Lamar's "Count Me Out" as a therapist.

Television career

Prime Suspect 
Mirren is known for her role as detective Jane Tennison in the widely viewed Prime Suspect, a multiple award-winning television drama series that was noted for its high quality and popularity. Her portrayal of Tennison won her three consecutive British Academy Television Awards for Best Actress between 1992 and 1994 (making her one of four actors to have received three consecutive BAFTA TV Awards for a role, alongside Robbie Coltrane, Julie Walters and Michael Gambon). Primarily due to Prime Suspect, in 2006 Mirren came 29th on ITV’s poll of TV's 50 Greatest Stars voted by the British public.

Other roles 
Mirren's other television performances include Cousin Bette (1971); As You Like It (1979); Blue Remembered Hills (1979); The Twilight Zone episode "Dead Woman's Shoes" (1985); The Passion of Ayn Rand (1999), where her performance won her an Emmy; Door to Door (2002); and The Roman Spring of Mrs. Stone (2003). In 1976, she appeared with Laurence Olivier, Alan Bates and Malcolm McDowell in a production of Harold Pinter's The Collection as part of the Laurence Olivier Presents series. She also played Queen Elizabeth I in 2005, in the television serial Elizabeth I, for Channel 4 and HBO, for which she received an Emmy Award and a Golden Globe Award. Mirren won another Emmy Award on 16 September 2007 for her role in Prime Suspect: The Final Act on PBS in the same category as in 2006. Mirren hosted Saturday Night Live on 9 April 2011. In 2022, she portrayed Cara Dutton in the Yellowstone spinoff 1923, which also featured Harrison Ford and Timothy Dalton.

Personal life

Mirren lived with Northern Irish actor Liam Neeson during the early 1980s; they met while working on Excalibur (1981). When interviewed by James Lipton for Inside the Actors Studio, Neeson said Mirren was instrumental in his getting an agent.

Mirren began dating American director Taylor Hackford in 1986. They were married on 31 December 1997 at the Ardersier Parish Church near Inverness in the Scottish Highlands. They met on the set of White Nights (1985). It is her first marriage and his third (he has two children from his previous marriages). She has no children, stating she has "no maternal instinct whatsoever".

Mirren's autobiography, In the Frame: My Life in Words and Pictures, was published in the UK by Weidenfeld & Nicolson in September 2007. Reviewing for The Stage, John Thaxter wrote: "Sumptuously illustrated, at first sight it looks like another of those photo albums of the stars. But between the pictures there are almost 200 pages of densely printed text, an unusually frank story of her private and professional life, mainly in the theatre, the words clearly Mirren's own, delivered with forthright candour."

In 1990, Mirren said in an interview that she was an atheist. In the August 2011 issue of Esquire, she said, "I am quite spiritual. I believed in fairies when I was a child. I still do sort of believe in the fairies. And the leprechauns. But I don't believe in God."

In a 2008 interview with GQ, Mirren revealed she was date raped as a student, and had often taken cocaine at parties in her twenties and until the 1980s. She stopped using it after reading that Klaus Barbie made a living from cocaine dealing.

On 11 May 2010, Mirren attended the unveiling of her waxwork at Madame Tussauds in London. In 2012, she was among the British cultural icons selected by artist Sir Peter Blake to appear in a new version of his most famous artwork—The Beatles' Sgt. Pepper's Lonely Hearts Club Band album cover—to celebrate the British cultural figures of his life that he most admired. In 2010, she was named Sexiest Woman Alive by Esquire, and in a 2011 photo shoot for the magazine, she stripped down and covered up with the Union Jack.

In 2013, Mirren was announced as one of several new models for Marks & Spencer's "Womanism" campaign. Subtitled "Britain's leading ladies", the campaign featured Mirren alongside British women from various fields, including pop singer Ellie Goulding, double Olympic gold medal-winning boxer Nicola Adams, and writer Monica Ali. In March 2013, The Guardian listed Mirren as one of the 50 Best-Dressed Over 50.

She told the Radio Times, "I'm a naturist at heart. I love being on beaches where everyone is naked. Ugly people, beautiful people, old people, whatever. It's so unisexual and so liberating." In 2004, she was named Naturist of the Year by British Naturism. She said: "Many thanks to British Naturism for this great honour. I do believe in naturism and am my happiest on a nude beach with people of all ages and races!"

In 2006, Mirren stated that she was never a member of any political party. Mirren became a U.S. citizen in 2017 and voted in her first U.S. election in 2020.

In April 2021, she took part in the music video "La Vacinada" (meaning the vaccinated woman in broken Spanish language) of Italian comedian and singer Checco Zalone.
In the song and video, Zalone jokes about the fact that, in times of Covid-19 pandemic, it is safer to have an affair with someone who has already been vaccinated against the virus, and as the elderly get vaccinated first, an older partner (played by Mirren in the video) is now the best choice.

Acting credits

Awards and honours

Among her major competitive awards, Mirren has won one Academy Award, four BAFTA Awards, three Golden Globe Awards, five Emmy Awards, and one Tony Award. Her numerous honorary awards include the BAFTA Fellowship from the British Academy of Film and Television Arts and Gala Tribute presented by the Film Society of Lincoln Center.

In the Queen's 2003 Birthday Honours, Mirren was appointed a Dame Commander of the Order of the British Empire (DBE) for services to drama, with investiture taking place at Buckingham Palace in December. In January 2009, Mirren was named on The Times' list of the top 10 British actresses of all time. The list included Julie Andrews, Helena Bonham Carter, Judi Dench and Audrey Hepburn.

Bibliography

See also
List of British actors
List of British Academy Award nominees and winners
List of actors with Academy Award nominations
List of actors with two or more Academy Award nominations in acting categories

Notes

References

Further reading 
  A survey of the actor's early career.

External links

 
 
 
 
 
 
 

1945 births
Living people
20th-century English actresses
21st-century English actresses
Actresses awarded damehoods
Actresses from Essex
Alumni of Middlesex University
Audiobook narrators
BAFTA fellows
Best Actress Academy Award winners
Best Actress BAFTA Award winners
Best Actress BAFTA Award (television) winners
Best Drama Actress Golden Globe (film) winners
Best Miniseries or Television Movie Actress Golden Globe winners
British naturists
Cannes Film Festival Award for Best Actress winners
Dames Commander of the Order of the British Empire
American atheists
American film actresses
American stage actresses
American television actresses
American people of English descent
American people of Russian descent
English atheists
English film actresses
English people of Russian descent
English radio actresses
English Shakespearean actresses
English stage actresses
English television actresses
English voice actresses
European Film Award for Best Actress winners
Fellows of the American Academy of Arts and Sciences
Golden Orange Honorary Award winners
Honorary Golden Bear recipients
Laurence Olivier Award winners
National Youth Theatre members
Naturalized citizens of the United States
Outstanding Performance by a Cast in a Motion Picture Screen Actors Guild Award winners
Outstanding Performance by a Female Actor in a Leading Role Screen Actors Guild Award winners
Outstanding Performance by a Female Actor in a Miniseries or Television Movie Screen Actors Guild Award winners
Outstanding Performance by a Female Actor in a Supporting Role Screen Actors Guild Award winners
Outstanding Performance by a Lead Actress in a Miniseries or Movie Primetime Emmy Award winners
People from Hammersmith
People from Westcliff-on-Sea
Royal Shakespeare Company members
Tony Award winners
Volpi Cup for Best Actress winners
21st-century American actresses
American naturists